The 2022–23 Boston Celtics season is the 77th season in the National Basketball Association (NBA). The Celtics are coming off of a loss to the Golden State Warriors in six games in the 2022 NBA Finals the season prior.

In the offseason, head coach Ime Udoka was suspended until June 30, 2023 for a violation of the team's code of conduct, after a team investigation into an inappropriate relationship between Udoka and a female Celtics staff member. Assistant coach Joe Mazzulla was named interim head coach on September 22, 2022. After 42 wins in the first 59 games of the season, Mazzulla was named the permanent head coach and signed to a contract extension on February 16, 2023.

Draft 

The Celtics owed their first-round pick (25th overall) to the San Antonio Spurs. The Celtics only owned their second-round pick.

Roster

Standings

Division

Conference

Game log

Preseason 

|-style="background:#cfc;"
| 1
| October 2
| Charlotte
| 
| Jaylen Brown (24)
| Noah Vonleh (9)
| Malcolm Brogdon (9)
| TD Garden19,156
| 1–0
|-style="background:#fcc;"
| 2
| October 5
| Toronto
| 
| Jaylen Brown (23)
| Jayson Tatum (10)
| Malcolm Brogdon (9)
| TD Garden19,156
| 1–1
|-style="background:#cfc;"
| 3
| October 7
| @ Charlotte
| 
| Jaylen Brown (19)
| Noah Vonleh (13)
| Payton Pritchard (7)
| Greensboro Coliseum16,119
| 2–1
|-style="background:#fcc;"
| 4
| October 14
| @ Toronto
| 
| Brown, White (23)
| Jayson Tatum (9)
| Jayson Tatum (5)
| Bell Centre21,900
| 2–2

Regular season

|-style="background:#cfc;"
| 1
| October 18
| Philadelphia
| 
| Brown, Tatum (35)
| Jayson Tatum (12)
| Marcus Smart (7)
| TD Garden19,156
| 1–0
|-style="background:#cfc;"
| 2
| October 21
| @ Miami
| 
| Jayson Tatum (29)
| White, G. Williams (7)
| Jayson Tatum (4)
| FTX Arena19,600
| 2–0
|-style="background:#cfc;"
| 3
| October 22
| @ Orlando
| 
| Jayson Tatum (40)
| Jaylen Brown (9)
| Marcus Smart (8)
| Amway Center19,299
| 3–0
|-style="background:#fcc;"
| 4
| October 24
| @ Chicago
| 
| Jayson Tatum (26)
| Jayson Tatum (8)
| Marcus Smart (6)
| United Center17,673
| 3–1
|-style="background:#fcc;"
| 5
| October 28
| Cleveland
| 
| Brown, Tatum (32)
| Jaylen Brown (8)
| Marcus Smart (7)
| TD Garden19,156
| 3–2
|-style="background:#cfc;"
| 6
| October 30
| Washington
| 
| Jaylen Brown (24)
| Jaylen Brown (10)
| Marcus Smart (6)
| TD Garden19,156
| 4–2

|-style="background:#fcc;"
| 7
| November 2
| @ Cleveland
| 
| Jaylen Brown (30)
| Tatum, Horford (12)
| Tatum, White (6)
| Rocket Mortgage FieldHouse 19,432
| 4–3
|-style="background:#cfc;"
| 8
| November 4
| Chicago
| 
| Jayson Tatum (36)
| Jayson Tatum (12)
| Jayson Tatum (6)
| TD Garden19,156
| 5–3
|-style="background:#cfc;"
| 9
| November 5
| @ New York
| 
| Jaylen Brown (30)
| Noah Vonleh (7)
| Marcus Smart (11)
| Madison Square Garden19,812
| 6–3
|-style="background:#cfc;"
| 10
| November 7
| @ Memphis
| 
| Jayson Tatum (39)
| Malcolm Brogdon (10)
| Marcus Smart (11)
| FedExForum17,371
| 7–3
|-style="background:#cfc;"
| 11
| November 9
| Detroit
| 
| Jayson Tatum (31)
| Derrick White (8)
| Marcus Smart (11)
| TD Garden19,156
| 8–3
|-style="background:#cfc;"
| 12
| November 11
| Denver
| 
| Jayson Tatum (34)
| Brown, Tatum (8)
| Jaylen Brown (8)
| TD Garden19,156
| 9–3
|-style="background:#cfc;"
| 13
| November 12
| @ Detroit
| 
| Jayson Tatum (43)
| Tatum, G. Williams (10)
| Marcus Smart (10)
| Little Caesars Arena20,190
| 10–3
|-style="background:#cfc;"
| 14
| November 14
| Oklahoma City
| 
| Jayson Tatum (27)
| Al Horford (11)
| Marcus Smart (8)
| TD Garden19,156
| 11–3
|-style="background:#cfc;"
| 15
| November 16
| @ Atlanta
| 
| Jaylen Brown (22)
| Al Horford (11)
| Derrick White (10) 
| State Farm Arena18,165
| 12–3
|-style="background:#cfc;"
| 16
| November 18
| @ New Orleans
| 
| Jaylen Brown (27)
| Jaylen Brown (10)
| Jayson Tatum (10)
| Smoothie King Center17,828
| 13–3
|-style="background:#fcc;"
| 17
| November 21
| @ Chicago
| 
| Jayson Tatum (28)
| Jayson Tatum (11)
| Marcus Smart (8)
| United Center20,786
| 13–4
|-style="background:#cfc;"
| 18
| November 23
| Dallas
| 
| Jayson Tatum (37)
| Jayson Tatum (13)
| Marcus Smart (9)
| TD Garden19,156
| 14–4
|-style="background:#cfc;"
| 19
| November 25
| Sacramento
| 
| Jayson Tatum (30)
| Jayson Tatum (8)
| Horford, Smart (5)
| TD Garden19,156
| 15–4
|-style="background:#cfc;"
| 20
| November 27
| Washington
| 
| Jaylen Brown (36)
| Grant Williams (7)
| Marcus Smart (7)
| TD Garden19,156
| 16–4
|-style="background:#cfc;"
| 21
| November 28
| Charlotte
| 
| Jayson Tatum (35)
| Luke Kornet (8)
| Marcus Smart (15)
| TD Garden19,156
| 17–4
|-style="background:#cfc;"
| 22
| November 30
| Miami
| 
| Jayson Tatum (49)
| Jayson Tatum (11)
| Marcus Smart (9)
| TD Garden19,156
| 18–4

|-style="background:#fcc;"
| 23
| December 2
| Miami
| 
| Jaylen Brown (37)
| Jaylen Brown (14)
| Marcus Smart (9)
| TD Garden19,156
| 18–5
|-style="background:#cfc;"
| 24
| December 4
| @ Brooklyn
| 
| Jaylen Brown (34)
| Jayson Tatum (11)
| Malcolm Brogdon (8)
| Barclays Center18,043
| 19–5
|-style="background:#cfc;"
| 25
| December 5
| @ Toronto
| 
| Jayson Tatum (31)
| Jayson Tatum (12)
| Jaylen Brown (8)
| Scotiabank Arena19,800
| 20–5
|-style="background:#cfc;"
| 26
| December 7
| @ Phoenix
| 
| Brown, Tatum (25)
| Blake Griffin (9)
| Smart, White (6)
| Footprint Center17,071
| 21–5
|-style="background:#fcc;"
| 27
| December 10
| @ Golden State
| 
| Jaylen Brown (31)
| Jaylen Brown (9)
| Marcus Smart (5)
| Chase Center18,064
| 21–6
|-style="background:#fcc;"
| 28
| December 12
| @ L.A. Clippers
| 
| Jaylen Brown (21)
| Jayson Tatum (11)
| Malcolm Brogdon (6)
| Crypto.com Arena19,068
| 21–7
|-style="background:#cfc;"
| 29
| December 13
| @ L.A. Lakers
| 
| Jayson Tatum (44)
| Jaylen Brown (15)
| Brogdon, Smart, Tatum (6)
| Crypto.com Arena18,661
| 22–7
|-style="background:#fcc;"
| 30
| December 16
| Orlando
| 
| Jayson Tatum (31)
| Jayson Tatum (7)
| Marcus Smart (8)
| TD Garden19,156
| 22–8
|-style="background:#fcc;"
| 31
| December 18
| Orlando
| 
| Jaylen Brown (24)
| Jaylen Brown (14)
| Marcus Smart (7)
| TD Garden19,156
| 22–9
|-style="background:#fcc;"
| 32
| December 21
| Indiana
| 
| Jayson Tatum (41)
| Robert Williams III (12)
| Malcolm Brogdon (7)
| TD Garden19,156
| 22–10
|-style="background:#cfc;"
| 33
| December 23
| Minnesota
| 
| Jaylen Brown (36)
| Al Horford (11)
| Marcus Smart (10)
| TD Garden19,156
| 23–10
|-style="background:#cfc;"
| 34
| December 25
| Milwaukee
| 
| Jayson Tatum (41)
| Jayson Tatum (7)
| Marcus Smart (8)
| TD Garden19,156
| 24–10
|-style="background:#cfc;"
| 35
| December 27
| Houston
| 
| Jaylen Brown (39)
| Robert Williams III (15)
| Malcolm Brogdon (8)
| TD Garden19,156
| 25–10
|-style="background:#cfc;"
| 36
| December 29
| L.A. Clippers
| 
| Brown, Tatum (29)
| Jayson Tatum (11)
| Marcus Smart (9)
| TD Garden19,156
| 26–10

|-style="background:#fcc;"
| 37
| January 1
| @ Denver
| 
| Jaylen Brown (30)
| Jaylen Brown (8)
| Marcus Smart (7)
| Ball Arena19,641
| 26–11
|-style="background:#fcc;"
| 38
| January 3
| @ Oklahoma City
| 
| Jaylen Brown (29)
| Malcolm Brogdon (9)
| Marcus Smart (8)
| Paycom Center16,778
| 26–12
|-style="background:#cfc;"
| 39
| January 5
| @ Dallas
| 
| Jayson Tatum (29)
| Jayson Tatum (14)
| Jayson Tatum (10)
| American Airlines Center20,413
| 27–12
|-style="background:#cfc;"
| 40
| January 7
| @ San Antonio
| 
| Jayson Tatum (34)
| Robert Williams III (11)
| Derrick White (11)
| AT&T Center18,354
| 28–12
|-style="background:#cfc;"
| 41
| January 9
| Chicago
| 
| Jayson Tatum (32)
| Tatum, G. Williams (8)
| Jayson Tatum (7)
| TD Garden19,156
| 29–12
|-style="background:#cfc;"
| 42
| January 11
| New Orleans
| 
| Jaylen Brown (41)
| Jaylen Brown (12)
| Derrick White (6)
| TD Garden19,156
| 30–12
|-style="background:#cfc;"
| 43
| January 12
| @ Brooklyn
| 
| Jayson Tatum (20)
| Jayson Tatum (11)
| Marcus Smart (10)
| Barclays Center18,125
| 31–12
|-style="background:#cfc;"
| 44
| January 14
| @ Charlotte
| 
| Jayson Tatum (33)
| Robert Williams III (12)
| Marcus Smart (12)
| Spectrum Center19,608
| 32–12
|-style="background:#cfc;"
| 45
| January 16
| @ Charlotte
| 
| Jayson Tatum (51)
| Tatum, G. Williams, R. Williams (9)
| Derrick White (8)
| Spectrum Center19,227
| 33–12
|-style="background:#cfc;"
| 46
| January 19
| Golden State
| 
| Jayson Tatum (34)
| Jayson Tatum (19)
| Jayson Tatum (6)
| TD Garden19,156
| 34–12
|-style="background:#cfc;"
| 47
| January 21
| @ Toronto
| 
| Jaylen Brown (27)
| Jaylen Brown (8)
| Jaylen Brown (6)
| Scotiabank Arena19,800
| 35–12
|-style="background:#fcc;"
| 48
| January 23
| @ Orlando
| 
| Brown, Tatum (26)
| Jayson Tatum (6)
| Jayson Tatum (7)
| Amway Center19,196
| 35–13
|-style="background:#fcc;"
| 49
| January 24
| @ Miami
| 
| Jayson Tatum (31)
| Jayson Tatum (14)
| Jayson Tatum (7)
| Miami-Dade Arena19,705
| 35–14
|-style="background:#fcc;"
| 50
| January 26
| New York
| 
| Jayson Tatum (35)
| Jayson Tatum (14)
| Malcolm Brogdon (6)
| TD Garden19,156
| 35–15
|-style="background:#cfc;"
| 51
| January 28
| L.A. Lakers
| 
| Jaylen Brown (37)
| Jayson Tatum (11)
| Brogdon, Tatum (4)
| TD Garden19,156
| 36–15

|-style="background:#cfc;"
| 52
| February 1
| Brooklyn
| 
| Jayson Tatum (31)
| Derrick White (10)
| Derrick White (5)
| TD Garden19,156
| 37–15
|-style="background:#fcc;"
| 53
| February 3
| Phoenix
| 
| Jaylen Brown (27)
| Al Horford (9)
| Jayson Tatum (5)
| TD Garden19,156
| 37–16
|-style="background:#cfc;"
| 54
| February 6
| @ Detroit
| 
| Jayson Tatum (34)
| Robert Williams III (15)
| Derrick White (7)
| Little Caesars Arena17,933
| 38–16
|-style="background:#cfc;"
| 55
| February 8
| Philadelphia
| 
| Brogdon, White (19)
| Hauser, Tatum, G. Williams (8)
| Jayson Tatum (9)
| TD Garden19,156
| 39–16
|-style="background:#cfc;"
| 56
| February 10
| Charlotte
| 
| Jayson Tatum (41)
| Robert Williams III (16)
| Derrick White (10)
| TD Garden19,156
| 40–16
|-style="background:#cfc;"
| 57
| February 12
| Memphis
| 
| Derrick White (23)
| Robert Williams III (16)
| Derrick White (10)
| TD Garden19,156
| 41–16
|-style="background:#fcc;"
| 58
| February 14
| @ Milwaukee
| 
| Derrick White (27)
| Grant Williams (10)
| Derrick White (12)
| Fiserv Forum17,623
| 41–17
|-style="background:#cfc;"
| 59
| February 15
| Detroit
| 
| Jayson Tatum (38)
| Jayson Tatum (9)
| Jayson Tatum (7)
| TD Garden19,156
| 42–17
|- align="center"
| colspan="9" style="background:#bbcaff;" | All-Star Break

|- style="background:#cfc;"
| 60
| February 23
| @ Indiana
| 
| Jayson Tatum (31)
| Jayson Tatum (12)
| Brogdon, Tatum (7)
| Gainbridge Fieldhouse16,125
| 43–17
|-style="background:#cfc;"
| 61
| February 25
| @ Philadelphia
| 
| Jaylen Brown (26)
| Jayson Tatum (13)
| Jayson Tatum (6)
| Wells Fargo Center20,993
| 44–17
|-style="background:#fcc;"
| 62
| February 27
| @ New York
| 
| Malcolm Brogdon (22)
| Tatum, R. Williams (7)
| Jayson Tatum (9)
| Madison Square Garden19,812
| 44–18

|-style="background:#cfc;"
| 63
| March 1
| Cleveland
| 
| Jayson Tatum (41)
| Horford, Tatum, R. Williams (11)
| Jayson Tatum (8)
| TD Garden19,156
| 45–18
|-style="background:#fcc;"
| 64
| March 3
| Brooklyn
| 
| Jaylen Brown (35)
| Jayson Tatum (13)
| Marcus Smart (8)
| TD Garden19,156
| 45–19
|-style="background:#fcc;"
| 65
| March 5
| New York
| 
| Jayson Tatum (40)
| Al Horford (14)
| Horford, Tatum (6)
| TD Garden19,156
| 45–20
|-style="background:#fcc;"
| 66
| March 6
| @ Cleveland
| 
| Jaylen Brown (32)
| Jaylen Brown (13)
| Jaylen Brown (9)
| Rocket Mortgage FieldHouse19,432
| 45–21
|-style="background:#cfc;"
| 67
| March 8
| Portland
| 
| Jayson Tatum (30)
| Malcolm Brogdon (9)
| Derrick White (7)
| TD Garden19,156
| 46–21
|-style="background:#cfc;"
| 68
| March 11
| @ Atlanta
| 
| Jayson Tatum (34)
| Jayson Tatum (15)
| Brown, White (7)
| State Farm Arena17,884
| 47–21
|-style="background:#fcc;"
| 69
| March 13
| @ Houston
| 
| Jaylen Brown (43)
| Jayson Tatum (8)
| Jayson Tatum (6)
| Toyota Center18,055
| 47–22
|-style="background:#cfc;"
| 70
| March 15
| @ Minnesota
| 
| Jaylen Brown (35)
| Jayson Tatum (12)
| Horford, Smart (5)
| Target Center17,136
| 48–22
|-style="background:#cfc;"
| 71
| March 17
| @ Portland
| 
| Jayson Tatum (34)
| Jayson Tatum (12)
| Al Horford (10)
| Moda Center19,393
| 49–22
|-style="background:#fcc;"
| 72
| March 18
| @ Utah
| 
| Jaylen Brown (25)
| Luke Kornet (7)
| Brown, Tatum (6)
| Vivint Arena18,206
| 49–23
|-
| 73
| March 21
| @ Sacramento
|
|
|
|
| Golden 1 Center
|
|-
| 74
| March 24
| Indiana
|
|
|
|
| TD Garden
|
|-
| 75
| March 26
| San Antonio
|
|
|
|
| TD Garden
|
|-
| 76
| March 28
| @ Washington
|
|
|
|
| Capital One Arena
|
|-
| 77
| March 30
| @ Milwaukee
|
|
|
|
| Fiserv Forum
|
|-
| 78
| March 31
| Utah
|
|
|
|
| TD Garden
|

|-
| 79
| April 4
| @ Philadelphia
|
|
|
|
| Wells Fargo Center
|
|-
| 80
| April 5
| Toronto
|
|
|
|
| TD Garden
|
|-
| 81
| April 7
| Toronto
|
|
|
|
| TD Garden
|
|-
| 82
| April 9
| Atlanta
|
|
|
|
| TD Garden
|

Transactions

Trades

Free agency

Re-signed

Additions

Subtractions

References 

Boston Celtics seasons
Boston Celtics
Boston Celtics
Boston Celtics